The Cape Government Railways 4th Class 4-6-0TT of 1882 with Joy valve gear, was a South African steam locomotive from the pre-Union era in the Cape of Good Hope.

In 1882 and 1883, the Cape Government Railways placed 68   tank-and-tender locomotives in mainline service on all three its systems. It was an improved version of the 4th Class locomotives of 1880 and 1881 and was delivered in two versions, built by two manufacturers.

Of these locomotives, thirty-five were built by Neilson and Company with Joy valve gear. Seventeen of them were still in service when the South African Railways was established in 1912.

Manufacturers

The 4th Class 4-6-0TT tank-and-tender locomotive of 1880 had been designed by Michael Stephens, at that stage the Locomotive Superintendent of the Western System of the Cape Government Railways (CGR). This improved version was delivered to the CGR in 1882 and 1883. The contracts for their construction were divided between Robert Stephenson and Company and Neilson and Company. Robert Stephenson's built thirty-three locomotives with Stephenson valve gear.

Thirty-five were built by Neilson's, but with Joy valve gear. Of these, twenty-one locomotives went to the Western System operating out of Cape Town and were numbered in the range from W56 to W76. Four went to the Midland System operating out of Port Elizabeth and were numbered in the range from M76 to M79. Ten went to the Eastern System operating out of East London and were numbered in the range from E39 to E48.

Characteristics
All these locomotives had  diameter coupled wheels, unlike the six 4th Class locomotives which had been delivered to the Eastern System in 1880 and 1881 which had smaller  diameter coupled wheels. They were delivered with Joy valve gear and therefore had a semi-circular cut-out at the bottom of the side-tanks to allow access to part of the Joy valve gear mechanism which protruded above the running board.

Since these locomotives were delivered with permanently coupled tenders, their cabs did not need side entrances with double handrails like their predecessors of 1880 and 1881 did with their optional tenders. Access was by pairs of steps, mounted on the engine as well as on the tender, with one handrail attached to the engine and the other to the tender.

Modifications

Firebox
On the Eastern System, problems were experienced with the low-grade local coal from the Cyphergat and Molteno collieries in the Stormberg. It had a high content of non-combustible material which often caused delays since it required frequent stops to allow the stoker to clear the grate of clinker and ash, a tedious task which required the locomotive to be stationary.

John D. Tilney, the Eastern System Locomotive Superintendent, carried out many experiments in an attempt to overcome the coal problem. Some of these involved modifying some of the 4th Class locomotives to install oscillating firebars and larger fireboxes.

Spark arrester
Another modification by Tilney was an extended smokebox to make room for a very efficient spark arrester which was constructed of wire mesh. Several locomotives were altered to incorporate these spark arresters.

Tilney's initiatives did not pass unnoticed. In 1881, the General Manager appointed Hawthorne R. Thornton as Chief Locomotive Superintendent for the whole of the Cape of Good Hope in response to the "growing tendency on the part of the several Locomotive Superintendents to bring in modifications of designs in essential parts of the engines and rolling stock".

Smokebox
In the 1890s, some improvements to smokebox design took place. Extending the smokebox forward increased its volume. The increased amount of exhaust gases present in the smokebox had the effect of stabilising and improving the draught. The date of this improvement can be pinned to 1891 when the second batch of Michael Stephens’ Cape Government Railways (CGR) 5th Class 4-6-0 locomotives with their lengthened smokeboxes entered service. This had such a profound effect on the boiler’s steaming ability that virtually every locomotive on the CGR and NGR had their smokeboxes extended.

Converted Joys

While the locomotives proved to be good all-purpose engines, the Joy valve gear was not considered entirely satisfactory. After Michael Stephens retired and H.M. Beatty took over as Chief Locomotive Superintendent of the CGR in 1896, all the Neilson-built locomotives were converted to Stephenson valve gear and in the process also had their side-tanks removed. These modified tender locomotives became known as the Converted Joys.

Renumbering
All these locomotives were renumbered more than once during their service lives on the CGR. By 1886, the system prefixes had been done away with and the Midland System's locomotives had all been renumbered by replacing the letter prefix "M" with the numeral "1". The Western and Eastern System locomotives retained their numbers, but without their respective "W" or "E" prefixes. By 1888, the Eastern System locomotives had been renumbered into the 600 number range. The Midland System locomotives were renumbered to two-digit numbers by 1890. All these renumberings are listed in the table below.

In addition to the known numbering and renumbering, there appears to have been an intermediate CGR numbering system at some stage between 1884 and the renumbering of the late 1880s. Apart from photographic evidence, no information about this numbering system has been found as yet. An example is the picture below of no. 289 working near Bulawayo in Southern Rhodesia in 1897. This engine was used during the construction of the railway from Mafeking in the Cape of Good Hope via Bechuanaland to Bulawayo and was at the head of the first train to reach Bulawayo on 19 October 1897.

Service

Cape Government Railways
At the time these 4th Class locomotives entered service in 1882, the two Eastern System mainlines were open to King William's Town and approaching Sterkstroom respectively. Those of the Midland System were completed to Graaff Reinet and approaching Cradock respectively, while the Western System mainline was open to Beaufort West.

Oranje-Vrijstaat Gouwerment-Spoorwegen
In early 1897, six Converted Joy locomotives were sold to the Oranje-Vrijstaat Gouwerment-Spoorwegen (OVGS), where they were designated 4th Class G. These engines were all fitted with the Tilney-designed extended smokebox with spark arresters and had been reboilered prior to entering service on the OVGS. During reboilering, their Salter safety valves were replaced with the Ramsbottom type.

Beira and Mashonaland Railway
In 1898, two Converted Joy locomotives, numbers 59 and 71, were sold to Pauling and Company. Pauling's used them during the construction of the Beira and Mashonaland Railway and renumbered them 2 and 1 respectively.

South African Railways
When the Union of South Africa was established on 31 May 1910, the three Colonial government railways (CGR, Natal Government Railways and Central South African Railways) were united under a single administration to control and administer the railways, ports and harbours of the Union. Although the South African Railways and Harbours came into existence in 1910, the actual classification and renumbering of all the rolling stock of the three constituent railways was only implemented with effect from 1 January 1912.

By 1912, seventeen of these locomotives survived. They were considered obsolete by the South African Railways, designated Class 04 and renumbered by having the numeral "0" prefixed to their existing numbers. Despite being considered obsolete, some of them were still being employed as shunting locomotives in Port Elizabeth in 1932. The rest had been scrapped by 1918.

First World War
In 1915, shortly after the outbreak of the First World War, the German South West Africa colony was occupied by the Union Defence Forces. Since a large part of the territory's railway infrastructure and rolling stock was destroyed or damaged by retreating German forces, an urgent need arose for locomotives for use on the Cape gauge lines in that territory. In 1917, numbers 058, 060 to 064, 066 and 0631 were transferred to the Defence Department for service in South West Africa. All eight locomotives are believed to have returned to South Africa after the war.

Works numbers
The works numbers, years built, original numbers, renumbering and disposal of the Cape 4th Class Joy of 1882 are listed in the table.

Illustration
The following pictures illustrate some of the Converted Joy locomotives and the modifications done to them. Most of them had forfeited their "front porch" railings in the process of modification.

References

0350
0350
4-6-0 locomotives
2′C n2t locomotives
Neilson locomotives
Cape gauge railway locomotives
Railway locomotives introduced in 1882
1882 in South Africa
Scrapped locomotives